Loysburg is an unincorporated community in the Morrisons Cove area of South Woodbury Township, Bedford County, Pennsylvania, United States. It lies along Pennsylvania Route 36 and the Yellow Creek near the Loysburg Gap in Tussey Mountain. Once named "Pattonville" in 1844 but was renamed back to Loyburg in 1864. Northern Bedford County Middle/High School is located in the area.

General information
ZIP Code: 16659
Area Code: 814
Local Phone Exchanges: 423, 575, 766
School District: Northern Bedford County School District

References

External links
  Loysburg, Bedford County. PA town history
  The Complete Loy History the founder of Loysburg, PA
  Loysburg
Morrisons Cove's Community Website - News and Information for Morrisons Cove, Pennsylvania

Populated places established in 1795
Unincorporated communities in Bedford County, Pennsylvania
Unincorporated communities in Pennsylvania